Rob Reckers (born 29 August 1981 in Eindhoven, North Brabant) is a field hockey player from the Netherlands, who won the silver medal with the Dutch national team at the 2004 Summer Olympics in Athens.

References

External links
 

1981 births
Living people
Dutch male field hockey players
Olympic field hockey players of the Netherlands
Olympic silver medalists for the Netherlands
Field hockey players at the 2004 Summer Olympics
Field hockey players at the 2008 Summer Olympics
Sportspeople from Eindhoven
Olympic medalists in field hockey
Medalists at the 2004 Summer Olympics
2006 Men's Hockey World Cup players
2010 Men's Hockey World Cup players
21st-century Dutch people